Kristall Berdsk is an ice hockey team in Berdsk, Russia. They play in the Pervaya Liga, the third level of ice hockey in Russia.

External links
Official site

Ice hockey teams in Russia
Junior Hockey League (Russia) teams
Berdsk